Giuseppe Prestia (born 13 November 1993) is an Italian footballer who plays as a centre back for  club Cesena.

Club career
Prestia is a youth product of hometown club Palermo, and also served as team captain for the Primavera squad. He made his senior debut on 15 December 2010, playing the full 90 minutes in a 2010–11 UEFA Europa League game against FC Lausanne-Sport under head coach Delio Rossi.

In June 2012, he was loaned out to Serie B outfit Ascoli in order to make him gain more first team experience. He made his debut on 1 September against Bari.

At the end of the 2012-13 season it was announced that Prestia would not return to Palermo, moving permanently to Serie A side Parma. A month after his move to Parma, he joined Serie B team F.C. Crotone on a co-ownership deal.

In February 2014 Giuseppe moved to Oțelul Galați on a 6-month loan and the Romanian football club had the option to buy him for a two-year contract. In June 2014 Prestia returned to Parma.

He made his Serie A debut on 11 April 2015, playing the final five minutes in a 1–0 home win to league toppers Juventus. He found himself without a team by the end of the season, after Parma declared bankruptcy and was cancelled from the Italian football pyramid. In January 2016, he agreed to return in Romania to play for Petrolul Ploiești until the end of the season.

In June 2016, he moved back to Italy to accept a one-year contract with Lega Pro club Catanzaro.

On 22 July 2022, Prestia signed a two-season contract with Cesena.

International career
Prestia represented Italy at youth level, being part of U-16, U-18 and U-19 squads between 2009 and 2011.

References

1993 births
Living people
Footballers from Palermo
Italian footballers
Association football fullbacks
Palermo F.C. players
Ascoli Calcio 1898 F.C. players
F.C. Crotone players
ASC Oțelul Galați players
FC Petrolul Ploiești players
Virtus Francavilla Calcio players
U.S. Alessandria Calcio 1912 players
Cesena F.C. players
Liga I players
Serie A players
Serie B players
Serie C players
Italian expatriate footballers
Expatriate footballers in Romania
Italian expatriate sportspeople in Romania